Huddersfield Town's 1983–84 campaign was Town's first season in the second tier since the 1972–73 season under the management of Ian Greaves. They finished in 12th place.

Squad at the start of the season

Review
Following their impressive promotion campaign the previous season, many Town fans were hoping that Town would return to the promised land of the First Division and Town had a fairly good start to the season, with the exception of losing their 34 match unbeaten home record, which went back to the end of the 1981–82 season, when they lost 3–2 to Chelsea in September.

Following Christmas, Town suffered a dramatic lost in form, going on a run of 9 matches without a win, which seemed to put Town in a downward spiral right back to the Third Division. So Mick Buxton decided to bring in some more strikers on loan to help Town in their time of need.

Peter Eastoe (on loan from West Bromwich Albion) and Mel Eves (on loan from Wolverhampton Wanderers) helped bring up a mini-revival which eventually got Town clear of the relegation mess and finished in a respectable 12th place with 57 points, the same number of points as Fulham and Charlton Athletic.

Squad at the end of the season

Results

Division Two

FA Cup

League Cup

Appearances and goals

1983-84
English football clubs 1983–84 season